Dawesville is a Legislative Assembly electorate in the state of Western Australia. Dawesville is named for the southwestern Mandurah suburb of Dawesville, which falls within its borders.

History
Dawesville was created at the 1994 redistribution due to the rapid population growth in the Mandurah region. It had previously been part of the seat of Murray, with a small portion in Mandurah. Its initial member following its first contest at the 1996 election was Arthur Marshall, the former member for Murray. At the 2005 election, it was won by former Court minister Kim Hames, who had been the member for Yokine but lost to Labor's Bob Kucera in 2001. Despite being a smaller quota seat under the previous system of electoral malapportionment, the 2005 one vote one value reforms did not significantly affect the seat due to rapid population growth. In the 2021 state elections Lisa Munday defeated the sitting Liberal opposition leader, Zak Kirkup, turning it on paper into a safe Labor seat in one stroke. Munday became the first Labor member ever to win the seat. She won the seat on first preferences, receiving 57% of first preference votes in the electorate.

Geography
Dawesville takes in the southwestern suburbs of Mandurah between the Harvey Estuary and the Indian Ocean, crossing the Dawesville Cut and including the suburbs of Halls Head, Erskine, Falcon, Wannanup, Dawesville, Bouvard and Herron. As of the 2007 redistribution it now includes areas immediately south of Mandurah's city centre such as Dudley Park and part of Coodanup, an area which is historically more Labor-oriented than the rest of the electorate.

Members for Dawesville

Election results

References

External links
 

Dawesville
Mandurah